William Ian "Lon" Hatherell (born 9 September 1930) was a rugby union player who represented Australia.

Hatherell, a prop, was born in Toowoomba, Queensland and claimed a total of 2 international rugby caps for Australia.

References

Australian rugby union players
Australia international rugby union players
1930 births
Living people
Rugby union players from Queensland
Rugby union props